In Washington, there are several state courts. Judges are elected and serve four-year or six-year terms. Most judges first come to office when the governor of Washington appoints them after a vacancy is created – either by the death, resignation, retirement, or removal of a sitting judge, or when a new seat on the bench is created by the Washington State Legislature.

Supreme Court
The Washington Supreme Court is the state supreme court of Washington. It is the highest court in the state and is based in the Temple of Justice at the Washington State Capitol campus in the state capital of Olympia.

Almost all the cases that the Court hears are appeals from the decisions of the Washington Court of Appeals. The court has discretionary jurisdiction, meaning it may choose which cases to hear. The court has original jurisdiction over a few cases. These original cases are mostly known as "writ" or "mandamus" actions to force a state official to do or not do an official act of government. 

The Washington Supreme Court consists of a chief justice and eight justices, who are elected in nonpartisan elections and serve six-year terms. Terms are staggered so that three justices are elected every two years. There is a mandatory retirement age of 75.

Court of Appeals
The Washington Court of Appeals has three divisions, based in Tacoma, Seattle, and Spokane. This court considers appeals in civil and criminal cases that are appealed from Superior Courts. 

An appeal to the Court of Appeals is a matter of right - unlike the Washington Supreme Court, which has discretionary jurisdiction, the State Court of Appeals has mandatory jurisdiction – it must hear all civil and criminal appeals that are filed with the court.  Court of Appeals judges are elected and serve six-year terms.

Superior Court
Washington has 39 Superior Courts, one in each of Washington's 39 counties.  Superior Courts are the trial courts of general jurisdiction in Washington.  A Superior Court may consider all civil and criminal matters occurring within a county's boundary.  The Superior Court also has exclusive jurisdiction over civil matters in which the amount in controversy is more than $75,000, felony cases, estate and probate matters, family law cases (including divorces and child custody hearings), and juvenile proceedings.  They act as a court of appeal for cases from the District and Municipal Courts.  Superior Court judges are elected and serve four-year terms.

District and Municipal Courts
Each of Washington's 39 counties also has a state District Court. These are courts of limited jurisdiction that hear traffic infractions, criminal traffic citations, misdemeanors and gross misdemeanors, civil cases with an amount in controversy less than $100,000, and  small claims suits. The District Court conducts trials and other attendant hearings. District Court judges are elected and serve four-year terms.

Washington's cities may establish Municipal Courts (e.g., Seattle Municipal Court).    Municipal Courts are courts of limited jurisdiction like state District Courts, but Municipal Courts may not hear civil lawsuits.   A Municipal Court may only consider and has exclusive jurisdiction over non-criminal traffic citations, as well as misdemeanor and gross misdemeanor crimes that occur within a city's boundary. Municipal Courts conduct trials and other attendant hearings. Municipal Court judges are elected or appointed by mayors or city councils and serve four-year terms.

References

External links 
  of the Washington court system